Antonio Pigafetta was an Italian destroyer, and one of a dozen s built for the  (Royal Italian Navy) in the late 1920s. Completed in 1931, she served in World War II. She was captured by German forces, but was later sunk by Allied aircraft in 1945.

Design and description
Their complement during wartime was 222–225 officers and enlisted men.

The Navigatoris were powered by two Parsons geared steam turbines, each driving one propeller shaft using steam supplied by four Odero-Terni-Orlando water-tube boilers.

Their main battery consisted of six  guns in three twin-gun turrets, one each fore and aft of the superstructure and the third amidships. Anti-aircraft (AA) defense for the Navigatori-class ships was provided by a pair of  AA guns in single mounts abreast the forward funnel and a pair of twin-gun mounts for  machine guns. They were equipped with six  torpedo tubes in two triple mounts amidships. The Navigatoris could carry 86–104 mines.

Construction and career

Antonio Pigafetta was laid down by Cantieri navali del Quarnaro at their Fiume shipyard on 29 December 1928, launched on 10 November 1929 and commissioned on 1 May 1931.

Citations

Bibliography

External links
 Antonio Pigafetta Marina Militare website

Navigatori-class destroyers
Ships built in Fiume
1929 ships
World War II destroyers of Italy
Maritime incidents in October 1944
Naval ships of Italy captured by Germany during World War II
Destroyers of the Kriegsmarine
World War II destroyers of Germany
World War II shipwrecks in the Mediterranean Sea
Destroyers sunk by aircraft